St. James' Settlement (SJS) is a non-governmental charitable organisation in Hong Kong. It provides continuing care, family and counselling, rehabilitation, youth and community centre services. It aims at helping the needy to cope with social challenges. It has a wide range of beneficiaries, from children, teenagers, the elderly to the minority groups such as the mentally disabled and the East Asian Expatriate.

Background

History 
St. James' Settlement was founded by the Rt. Rev. Bishop R.O. Hall of the Anglican Church as a club for children in 1949. The club was originally operated in the temple of Northern King in Stone Nullah Lane, Wanchai. In 1963, it was rebuilt to a six-storey building and started to extend its service group to teenagers, the elderly and those with mental health problems. In 1987, Eastern Clinic and the office of the Civil Defence Corps were rebuilt to today's headquarter of the St. James' Settlement in Stone Nullah Lane. It is a multi-service community centre and the scope of services was further extended. After the Central and Western District Elderly Community Center was opened in 1991, different service centres developed and located along the North coast of Hong Kong Island. Currently, there are more than 20 service units in Hong Kong Island, Kowloon and New Territories with over 800 staff in the organisation.

Funding 
There are various channels for St. James' Settlement to collect funds.
 Subsidization from the Hong Kong Sheng Kung Hui (Anglican Church)
 Government subsidisation
 Lotteries Fund
 Grants
 Dues and fees
 Investment and Interests
 Other Income
 Donations from organisations in Hong Kong, for example:
 The Community Chest of Hong Kong
 Hong Kong Jockey Club Charities Trust
 Donations from individuals in Hong Kong and overseas, in the following forms
 Residues of inheritance
 Part of inheritance
 Transference of specific property or wealth
 Listing the organisation as the beneficiary of life insurance policy
 General donations (can be once-for-all donation or regular donation)

In the financial year 2008–2009, the organisation generated income of $339,484,185.14 and the dominant income sources are from Grants and Dues and fees and the organisation has a 3.38% reduce in income from Investments and interest.

Executive committee
As of 2016:
Patron: Regina Leung
President: Paul Kwong
Chairman: David Li
Vice-Chairman: Michael Leung
Honorary Treasurer: Robert E. McBain
Honorary Secretary: John R. Budge
Chaplain: Lysta Leung
Members: Andrew Chan Ping-chiu, Chan Lam Lai-king, Clifford K. Chiu, Chiu Koon G., Timothy Kwok Chi-pei, Lam Kui-chun, Jane Lee Ching-yee, Edward Leung Man-fuk, Brian Li Man-bun, Lo Kin-ming, Johnny Kin On Sin, Billy Leung Kam-man, David Au Chi-wai

References

Charities based in Hong Kong